Luis Fernando Montoya Soto (born 2 May 1957) is a former Colombian football manager, best known for leading Once Caldas to winning  2004 Copa Libertadores. He was shot during a robbery in December 2004. Since then he has been struggling with a tetraplegia.

Career
He started his career as a technical manager in Caldas, where he stood out as a good contributor then he began his physical training at the Jaime Izasa Cadavid Polytechnic at Medellín, although this was hidden from his father, who he did not want to share his studies where he focussed on his passion of sports.

Years after he went to different Antioquia leagues, where he got several titles, which led him to direct Colombian teams in minor football soccer divisions.

He made an excellent career in the minor divisions of the National Athletic professional soccer team gaining champion titles in different categories.  He led Atlético Nacional to the Colombian Professional Football Championship getting the subchampionship in 2002 into the second semester.

Montoya coached Once Caldas leading the team to win the Mustang Cup for the first time in their history (apart from 1950 win) and the Copa Libertadores de América in 2004, those achievements made Montoya the South American Coach of the Year in that year.

Now, he writes for popular Colombian newspapers like El Tiempo and La Patria and teaches sport journalism in several Colombian Universities.

Personal life
He was born in the town of Caldas, Colombia. He married Adriana Herrera in 1998 and had a child in 2001 named José Fernando Montoya who has been a symbol of Luis Fernando's life spirit. In December 2004, Montoya was left paralyzed after he got shot during an attempted robbery in Caldas near Medellín.  Since then he had been under experimental stem cell treatment to help him get better. A practicing Catholic and full of tenacity, he has become an example of permanent hope against paralysis to Colombians and has been called The Champion of Life. Nowadays, he lives in Medellín with his son and his wife.

References

1961 births
Living people
Colombian football managers
Atlético Nacional managers
Once Caldas managers